Anstey-Hunakwa Provincial Park is a provincial park in the Shuswap Country of the Southern Interior of British Columbia, Canada.  6,852 hectares in size, the park was established 18 April 2001.

The park aims to protect grizzly, black bear, moose, mule deer, pine marten, and Townsend's big-eared bat. Includes the most extensive undisturbed Interior Cedar Hemlock moist-warm Variant 3.

Access
Access to the park is by boat at the north end of Anstey Arm on Shuswap Lake. The closest communities are Sicamous, Sorrento and Salmon Arm.

References

External links
Anstey-Hunakwa Provincial Park

Provincial parks of British Columbia
Parks in the Shuswap Country
Monashee Mountains
2001 establishments in British Columbia